The 1954 Atlantic hurricane season was an above-average Atlantic hurricane season in terms of named storms, with 16 forming. Overall, the season resulted in $751.6 million in damage, the most of any season at the time. The season officially began on June 15, and nine days later the first named storm developed. Hurricane Alice developed in the Gulf of Mexico and moved inland along the Rio Grande, producing significant precipitation and record flooding that killed 55 people. Activity was slow until late August; only Barbara, a minimal tropical storm, developed in July. In the span of two weeks, hurricanes Carol and Edna followed similar paths before both striking New England as major hurricanes. The latter became the costliest hurricane in Maine's history.

In late September, Tropical Storm Gilda killed 29 people after drenching northern Honduras. A tropical depression in early October was captured by a high-altitude photograph on a rocket, thus producing the first large-scale image of a tropical cyclone. The strongest and deadliest hurricane of the season was Hurricane Hazel, which killed thousands in Haiti before striking near the North Carolina/South Carolina border in October. It caused heavy damage in the United States before becoming extratropical and affecting Ontario. Intense rainfall affected Toronto with severe flooding, leaving significant damage. The season officially ended on November 15, although another hurricane named Alice developed on December 30 to the northeast of the Lesser Antilles; it lasted until January 6 of the following year. In total, there were 16 tropical storms, 7 hurricanes, and 3 major hurricanes.

Season summary 

The hurricane season officially began on June 15, when the United States Weather Bureau in Miami, Florida, began 24‑hour operations. The agency, under the direction of Grady Norton had access to 43 other weather stations across the Atlantic basin. Norton died during the season from a stroke while tracking Hurricane Hazel. Additionally, a group of Hurricane Hunters planes were put on standby for the season, able to be flown out into storms and collect data. During the season, there were eight named storms, as well as an unnamed hurricane and a tropical depression. The season officially ended on November 15, although an unnamed tropical storm formed a day later. In addition, Tropical Storm Alice developed on December 31, the latest a tropical cyclone has developed in the calendar year.

Cumulatively, tropical cyclones left 193 deaths and $756 million in damage, becoming the costliest hurricane season at the time. The season was one of six to have three major hurricanes strike the country, along with 2005 (which had four), 1893, 1909, 1933, and 2004. Two of the major hurricanes – Carol and Edna – struck New England; this occurred despite an average of only 5–10 New England hurricanes per century. Carol struck Connecticut as a hurricane and left widespread heavy damage. Only ten days later, Edna became the costliest hurricane in Maine's history. Unusually, no tropical cyclones affected Florida.

The season's activity was reflected with a cumulative accumulated cyclone energy (ACE) rating of 111, which is categorized as being "above normal". ACE is, broadly speaking, a measure of the power of the hurricane multiplied by the length of time it existed, so storms that last a long time, as well as particularly strong hurricanes, have high ACEs. ACE is only calculated for full advisories on tropical systems at or exceeding  or tropical storm strength.

Systems

Tropical Storm One 

A broad trough developed over the eastern Gulf of Mexico on May 26. A frontal disturbance formed over Florida along the trough, spawning an area of broad cyclonic turning. Ship observations in the region suggested that the depression intensified into a tropical storm by late on May 28. The system was small, and was not discovered to have been a tropical cyclone until a reanalysis of data in 2015. The storm moved to the northeast ahead of an approaching trough, bypassing the Carolinas to the east; rainfall brushed the coast of North Carolina. On the next day, the storm became associated with a warm front, indicating that it became extratropical to the southeast of New England. Continuing to the northeast, the former storm crossed over the southeastern coast of Newfoundland before being absorbed by another nontropical low to the northwest on May 31.

Tropical Storm Two 

A trough formed over southern Florida on June 17. Early the next day, a circulation formed, signaling that a tropical depression also developed over the Everglades. The system moved slowly north-northeastward, emerging into the western Atlantic Ocean at 06:00 UTC on June 20. Shortly thereafter, the depression intensified into a tropical storm, although the structure was broad and asymmetric due to association with a nearby upper-level low, signaling that the system was possibly a subtropical cyclone. Ship reports in the region indicate that the storm continued to intensify. The storm accelerated northeastward due to an approaching cold front. On June 24, the storm became extratropical, and shortly thereafter made landfall along southwestern Nova Scotia. The system dissipated the next day over the northern Gulf of Saint Lawrence.

Hurricane Alice (June) 

On June 24, Tropical Storm Alice developed rapidly in the western Gulf of Mexico, giving the citizens of southern Texas and northeastern Mexico little time to prepare. By June 25, Alice intensified to hurricane status, reaching peak winds of  that day, before making landfall in northeastern Mexico, just south of the Mexico–United States border. The storm progressed inland along the Rio Grande Valley, dissipating on June 27.

In Mexico, Alice left minor damage, and killed one person due to a fallen power line. Across Texas, Alice dropped torrential rainfall, peaking at  near Pandale, with most of the rainfall concentrated around the Pecos River. High precipitation accumulations occurred in areas that had seen little rains in three years. This led to significant flooding along the Pecos River that produced "probably the greatest rate of runoff for a watershed of [that] size in the United States", as reported by the International Boundary and Water Commission. Ozona, Texas, sustained the most impact, estimated at $2 million in damage. Overall there were at least 55 deaths.

Tropical Storm Four 

A dissipating cold front stalled over the southeastern United States from Arkansas to North Carolina on July 9. On the next day, a low pressure area developed along the coast of Georgia. Soon after, the front dissipated, and by 12:00 UTC on July 10, the system developed into a tropical storm. Observations from a coastal lighthouse and a nearby ship indicated that the storm attained peak winds of  while moving slowly east-northeastward, just offshore the Carolinas. The storm began weakening on July 13, and dissipated the next day when it was absorbed by a larger extratropical storm that was developing to the north.

Tropical Storm Barbara 

A map of the low pressure areas forming in July 1954 indicated that the system originated near the Mississippi Delta and tracked southward. After forming, the depression tracked northwestward, intensifying into Tropical Storm Barbara early on July 28. Officials at the United States Weather Bureau posted a storm warning from Cameron to Burrwood, Louisiana, and also advised small craft to remain at port along the entire northern Gulf Coast. Without intensifying further, Barbara made landfall near Vermilion Bay, Louisiana on July 29, dissipating the next day over Texas. The rains caused flooding as well as some damage to the rice crop. However, the Monthly Weather Review yearly summary described the precipitation as "far more beneficial than damaging". There was no wind damage.

Hurricane Carol 

Carol developed from a tropical wave near the Bahamas on August 25. It quickly intensified as it tracked generally to the north, becoming a hurricane on August 27. It intensified further as it accelerated, striking eastern Long Island as Category 3 hurricane. Carol made its final landfall on Old Saybrook, Connecticut, late on August 31. Within a few hours, the hurricane became extratropical over New Hampshire, which later dissipated over Quebec.

In North Carolina, hurricane-force winds left minor damage to houses, estimated around $228,000. Rains from Carol alleviated drought conditions in the Washington, D.C. area. High winds left 275,000 homes without power, and damage totaled $3 million on the island.

Widespread areas were left without power from eastern Connecticut to southern Massachusetts. Further north in Maine, Hurricane Carol downed hundreds of trees, as well as destroying widespread apple groves and corn fields. It became the costliest natural disaster in the state's history, only to be surpassed by Hurricane Edna ten days later. Across New England, the hurricane destroyed about 4,000 homes, 3,500 cars, and 3,000 boats. Damage totaled $460 million, and there were 60 deaths. In neighboring Canada, high rains caused flooding while strong winds downed trees and power lines.

Hurricane Dolly 

A tropical wave spawned a tropical depression on August 31 to the northwest of Puerto Rico. It moved rapidly north-northwestward, intensifying into Tropical Storm Dolly later that day and into a hurricane early on September 1. Early in the storm's duration, the U.S. Weather Bureau noted the potential for Dolly to affect the same areas of New England that Hurricane Carol struck just days prior. However, the hurricane turned to the north away from land. Dolly turned to the northeast on September 2 and became extratropical later that day to the south of Nova Scotia. It was tracked until September 4, until it was last located to the north of the Azores. There was no reported damage.

Hurricane Edna 

As Dolly became extratropical, the tropical depression that later became Hurricane Edna developed east of the Lesser Antilles on September 2. It moved northwestward, dropping heavy rainfall on Puerto Rico as it passed north of the island. It turned to the north and northeast, bypassing the Outer Banks and skirting Cape Cod. On September 11, Edna struck Massachusetts as a strong Category 2 hurricane. The hurricane later moved ashore near the border between Maine and New Brunswick around the time it became extratropical. The remnants persisted a few more days before dissipating south of Greenland.

Early in its duration, Edna produced high seas and gale-force winds in the Bahamas, but there was no damage there. Hurricane-force winds occurred in the Outer Banks, although damage was minor. As it passed New England, Edna produced a  storm surge during a high tide, which caused severe flooding in Martha's Vineyard, Nantucket, and Cape Cod. The hurricane dropped additional heavy rainfall to areas affected by Carol, resulting in flooding in Massachusetts and Rhode Island. In Long Island and New England, the hurricane left over $42 million in damage and 20 deaths, only 11 days after Carol affected the same area. About a third of the damage occurred in Maine, becoming the costliest hurricane on record in the state. Hurricane-force winds extended into Canada, causing $6 million in damage (1954 CAD), mostly from crop damage. There was one death in Nova Scotia.

Tropical Storm Nine 

A surface trough persisted across the central Atlantic Ocean on September 2. Over the next few days, the system moved slowly northeastward, independent of any frontal systems. On September 6, nearby ships indicated that the a closed circulation had developed, marking the genesis of the system as a tropical depression. By the next day, the system became extratropical, and soon after was absorbed by a larger extratropical storm to the north.

Tropical Storm Florence 

A tropical storm formed in the Bay of Campeche on September 11. Given the name Florence, the storm moved generally west-southwestward with a small radius of maximum winds. Before the storm moved ashore, officials in Veracruz evacuated residents from low-lying areas, and overall about 90,000 people left their homes. On September 12, Florence moved ashore between Tuxpan, and Nautla, Veracruz and quickly dissipated. Damage was heaviest around Poza Rica, primarily from the destruction of banana plantations. Monetary damage was estimated around $1.5 million, and there were five reported deaths.

Tropical Storm Eleven 

A low pressure area was present north of the Yucatán Peninsula on September 14. Nearby ship observations indicated that a tropical depression developed the next day in the central Gulf of Mexico, although the system's large structure meant it could have been a subtropical cyclone. On the next day, the system began weakening over water, dissipating on September 18 without moving ashore.

Tropical Storm Gilda 

On September 24, Tropical Storm Gilda developed in the central Caribbean Sea about halfway between Jamaica and Colombia. A small storm, it moved westward throughout its duration. On September 26, Gilda attained peak winds of  while nearing northeastern Honduras. The storm paralleled the coastline a short distance offshore, maintaining its intensity before hitting and later weakening over Belize on September 27. It re-emerged in the Gulf of Mexico before making another landfall near Tampico as a tropical depression on September 29, dissipating the next day.

The waters caused the widespread destruction of banana plantations and houses, leaving about 3,000 people homeless. The United Fruit Company reacted to this destruction by firing 10,000 of its about 100,000 workers within Honduras. Honduras's then-President Juan Manuel Gálvez appealed for aid from the United States. In response, U.S. Air Force planes flew food, medicine, rafts, and water purification tablets to the most-affected regions. A total of 29 people were killed in Honduras. When Gilda made its landfall in Belize, it left little property damage and no deaths.

Hurricane Thirteen 

A tropical depression formed in the Central Atlantic on September 25. It drifted east-northeastward, eventually becoming a tropical storm on September 29. The storm curved to the west and west-southwest, becoming a hurricane on October 2. It turned to the northeast on October 3, and reached a peak of  winds about halfway between Bermuda and the Azores. By that point it began accelerating, and late on October 6 the hurricane became extratropical over the Northeastern Atlantic. Early the next day it was last observed to the south of Iceland. The hurricane was not named due to its presence in the eastern Atlantic and not being a threat to land.

Unnumbered Tropical Depression 

On October 2, a tropical depression moved westward from the coast of Cuba into the Gulf of Mexico. The depression weakened as it moved across southern Texas and dropped heavy rainfall. The rainfall rates of about an inch per hour was the heaviest since June 1950. The depression also moved ashore with high waves and tides.

When the system reached the Big Bend region on October 5 it reintensified slightly. Around that time, the United States Navy conducted a rocket test from White Sands, New Mexico; this was despite that such tests were rarely performed when the skies were cloudy. The depression later moved into New Mexico and dropped additional rainfall, interacting with an approaching cold front. Flooding was reported around Roswell, as well as along the Pecos River system. The system dissipated on October 7.

Hurricane Hazel 

Hurricane Hazel was the deadliest and second costliest hurricane of the season. The storm killed as many as 1,000 people in Haiti before striking the United States near the border between North and South Carolina, as a Category 4 hurricane. After causing 95 fatalities in the U.S., Hazel struck Canada as an extratropical storm, raising the death toll by 81 people, mostly in Toronto.

Hazel formed on October 5 just east of the Windward Islands and intensified into a Category 1 hurricane while crossing the southeastern Caribbean Sea. After making a hard turn northward, it rapidly intensified as it approached Haiti, reaching Category 3 intensity before landfall. In Haiti, Hazel destroyed 40% of the coffee trees and 50% of the cacao crop, affecting the economy for several years to come. It fluctuated in intensity before making landfall as a Category 4 hurricane in the Carolinas, which destroyed most waterfront dwellings near its point of impact. It affected several more states, including Delaware, Maryland, New Jersey, New York, Pennsylvania, Virginia, and West Virginia, bringing gusts near  and causing $308 million in damage.

When Hazel arrived in Ontario, rivers and streams passing through the Greater Toronto Area overflowed their banks, causing severe flooding. As a result, many residential areas located in floodplains, such as the Raymore Drive area, were subsequently converted to parkland. In Canada alone, over C$135 million (2009: $1.1 billion) of damage was incurred. Hazel was particularly destructive in Toronto, as a result of a combination of a lack of experience in dealing with tropical storms and the storm's unexpected retention of power. Hazel had traveled  over land, but while approaching Canada, it had merged with an existing powerful cold front. The storm stalled over the Greater Toronto Area, and although it was now extratropical, it remained as powerful as a category 1 hurricane. To help with the cleanup, 800 members of the military were summoned, and a Hurricane Relief Fund was established that distributed $5.1 million (2009: $41.7 million) in aid.

Tropical Storm Fifteen 

On November 16, a tropical depression developed about halfway between the Lesser Antilles and the Azores. The storm maintained that intensity on November 21 when it began weakening, dissipating later that day.

Hurricane Alice (December) 

The final storm of the season, Alice, developed on December 30 from a trough of low pressure in the central Atlantic Ocean in an area of unusually favorable conditions. The storm moved southwestward and gradually strengthened to reach hurricane status. It persisted into the following calendar year, passing through the Leeward Islands on January 2. Alice reached peak winds of  before encountering cold air and turning to the southeast. It dissipated on January 6 over the southeastern Caribbean Sea.

Alice produced heavy rainfall and moderately strong winds across several islands along its path. Saba and Anguilla were affected the most, with total damage amounting to $623,500 (1955 USD). Operationally, lack of definitive data prevented the U.S. Weather Bureau from declaring the system a hurricane until January 2. It received the name Alice in early 1955, though re-analysis of the data supported extending its track to the previous year, resulting in two tropical cyclones of the same name in one season. It was one of only two storms to span two calendar years, along with Tropical Storm Zeta (2005) in 2005–06.

Storm names 
The following names were used for named storms (tropical storms and hurricanes) that formed in the North Atlantic in 1954. The list was the same as 1953 with the exception of Gilda, which replaced Gail due to the name's confusion with the term gale.

 Alice (1)
 Barbara
 Carol
 Dolly
 Edna
 Florence
 Gilda
 Hazel
 Alice (2)

Retirement 

The name Carol was re-used in the 1965 season, but was retroactively retired when the modern naming system was introduced and replaced with Camille. Edna was reused in 1968 and retired. Hazel was not re-used and was retired.

See also 

 List of Atlantic hurricanes
 Atlantic hurricane season
 Australian region cyclone seasons: 1953–54 1954–55
 South Pacific cyclone seasons: 1953–54 1954–55
 South-West Indian Ocean cyclone seasons: 1953–54 1954–55

Notes

References

External links 
 Monthly Weather Review